Christopher Stevens or Stephens may refer to:

 Paul Tabori (1909–1974), British-Hungarian author, also known as Christopher Stevens
 Chris Stephens (cricketer) (born 1948), South African cricketer
 J. Christopher Stevens (1960–2012), American ambassador to Libya killed by al Qaeda terrorists in Benghazi September  11, 2012
 Christopher Stevens (musician) (born 1967), American record producer and songwriter
 Chris Stephens (born 1973), Scottish National Party Member of Parliament for Glasgow South West
 Chris Stephens (rugby union) (born 1975), Welsh rugby union player
 Chris Stevens (Northern Exposure), a character on Northern Exposure

See also
 Chris Stevens (disambiguation)